Karlous is a masculine given name. Notable people with the name include:

Karlous Marx Shinohamba (born 1965), Namibian politician
Karlous Miller (born 1983), American comedian, actor, and rapper

See also

Karlos (name)

Masculine given names